Love Thy Neighbor is a Canadian made-for-TV thriller movie directed by Paul Schneider, originally released for the United States in 2006.

Plot

The main protagonist, Laura Benson (Alexandra Paul) and her family (Gary Hudson and Ksenia Solo), move to a new gated community after a violent break and enter. After a series of unfortunate and suspicions events, Laura starts to suspect her over-friendly neighbor is to blame.

Cast

 Alexandra Paul – Laura Benson
 Shannon Lawson – Janis Rivers
 Gary Hudson – Jim Benson
 Ksenia Solo – Erin Benson
 Rod Crowley – Crowley
 John Bourgeois – Detective Zeller
 Michelle Killoran – Jenny Rivers
 John Jarvis – Alan Rivers
 Scott Wickware – Coach Brand
 James Binkley – Shooter
 Sean Baek – Accomplice / Jack Kim
 Ricardo Betancourt – Assistant
 Barbara Gordon – Micky Gallaghan
 Tomoko Siu – Streetgirl
 Justine Campbell – Waitress
 Paul Stephen – Principal Bennet
 Diego Fuentes – ACS Officer
 Nicole Mauffrey – Receptionist (uncredited)

Crew

 Julian Grant – producer
 Michael Jacobs – executive producer
 Fernando Szew – executive producer
 Norman Orenstein – music
 J.P. Locherer (Joseph Locherer) – cinematographer
 Ben Wilkinson – film editor
 Lindsay Chag – casting
 Brian Levy – casting

Technical

 Filming location – Guelph, Ontario, Canada
 Production Company – LTN Productions INC.
 Runtime  – 89 minutes
 Rating - TV-PG

References

2006 television films
2006 films
2006 thriller films
Canadian thriller films
Canadian thriller television films
English-language Canadian films
Films directed by Paul Schneider (director)
2000s Canadian films